The 2017 Women’s Euro Beach Soccer Cup was the second edition of the Women's Euro Beach Soccer Cup, an international, European beach soccer championship for women's national teams, organised annually by Beach Soccer Worldwide (BSWW). The event was revealed on April 21, 2017.

Six nations took part in a three day competition hosted in Nazaré, Portugal, between 7 and 9 July, alongside stage 2 of the men's 2017 Euro Beach Soccer League. Originally scheduled to take place in Sanxenxo, Spain, BSWW announced on June 1 the competition would be moved to Nazaré due to administrative issues.

Spain were the defending champions but failed to progress pass the group stage, ultimately finishing in fifth. The tournament was won by England, who claimed their maiden European crown. This was the first time an English side won a major beach soccer trophy in either a women's or a men's championship.

Teams
All six teams from the inaugural edition returned, except for hosts Portugal, who were replaced by the Czech Republic.
1

1. Teams making their debut

Draw
The draw took place on June 20, 2017 at BSWW's headquarters in Barcelona. The six teams were split into two groups of three. Spain, as champions of the previous edition in 2016, were allocated to position A1 and Switzerland, as runners up in 2016, were allocated to B1. The other nations were then drawn to accompany them in the two groups.

Group stage
All matches took place at the Estádio do Viveiro at the Praia de Nazaré with a capacity of 1,600, other than the Switzerland v Czech Republic match which took place on an external pitch.

The teams competed in a round robin format. The winners of the groups proceeded to contest the final. The respective group runners-up and third placed nations played in consolation matches to decide third through sixth place in the final standings.

Matches are listed as local time in Nazaré, WEST (UTC+1)

Group A

Group B

Playoffs

Fifth place play-off

Third place play-off

Final

Awards
After the final, the following awards were presented.

Winners trophy

Individual awards

Goalscorers
5 goals
 Gemma Hillier

4 goals
 Molly Clark

3 goals

 Maria Soto Bravo
 Grytsje Van den Berg
 Nicole Heer

2 goals

 Joelle de Bondt
 Andrea Miro Castro
 Lorena Asensio
 Shannon Sievwright
 Ramona Birrfelder
 Nathalie Schenk
 Sandra Maurer
 Marketa Matejkova
 Sarah Kempson
 Franziska Steinemann

1 goal

 Karen Moreira Sanchez
 Marianne ten Brinke
 Martina Folprechtova
 Carla Morera
 Carolina González
 Andrea Morger
 Alina Grueter
 Deborah Kehrli
 Lucy Quinn
 Dimitra Kossova
 Maria Potsiou
 Ionna Melissou
 Suzana Zdravkovic
 Lucie Navratilova
 Selene Alegre

Final standings

References

External links
Women's Euro Beach Soccer Cup Nazaré 2017, Beach Soccer Worldwide

Women
2017 in beach soccer
2017 in Portuguese sport
International association football competitions hosted by Portugal
July 2017 sports events in Portugal